List of cities in the Americas:

List of cities in North America
List of cities in South America

See also
Largest cities in the Americas
 

Americas-related lists